Ragged Valley is a valley, in the Diablo Range in Fresno County, California. It was named for the ragged appearance of its surface. It is bound on the east by the Big Blue Hills and on the west by Joaquin Ridge.

References

Valleys of Fresno County, California
Diablo Range